The Battle of Marengo (14 June 1800) was fought between the French army of First Consul Napoleon Bonaparte and an Habsburg army led by General der Kavallerie Michael von Melas. With Napoleon's army lying across the Habsburg army's line of communications to the west, Melas resolved to attack. Early in the morning, the Habsburg army advanced from the city of Alessandria and took the French army by surprise. It was not until 9:00 am before Melas' army completely moved through a bottleneck at the Bormida River bridges. At first the Austrian attack stalled, slowed by bitter French resistance. By 3:00 pm, the Habsburg army compelled their outnumbered opponents to retreat. Sore from having two horses killed under him, Melas handed over command of the pursuit to a subordinate and went to the rear. Later in the afternoon, a newly-arrived French division suddenly attacked the pursuing Austrians. Combined with a quick burst of cannon fire and a well-timed cavalry charge, the surprise assault caused a complete collapse of the Austrian center column, which fled to the temporary safety of Alessandria. The French suffered at least 7,700 casualties, including two generals killed and five wounded. The Austrians admitted losing 9,416 killed, wounded and missing, but some estimates range as high as 11,000–12,000 casualties. The Austrians lost one general killed and five wounded. The next day, Melas requested an armistice. The victory gave Bonaparte enough bargaining leverage to gain control of northwest Italy during the subsequent negotiations.

French Army

General Staff
First Consul Napoleon Bonaparte
Commander-in-Chief: General of Division Louis-Alexandre Berthier (acted as Chief of Staff and Reserve Commander) 
Chief of Staff: General of Division Pierre Dupont de l'Étang 
Chief Engineer: General of Division Armand Samuel de Marescot 
Chief of Artillery: General of Brigade Auguste de Marmont

Corps Commanders

Organization

Habsburg Army

General Staff
Commander-in-chief: General der Kavallerie Michael von Melas
Chief of Staff: General-major Anton von Zach

Habsburg commanders

Organization

Notes
Footnotes

Citations

References

External links
 This is the source of the full names of French generals.
 This is the source of the full names of Habsburg Austrian generals.

Napoleonic Wars orders of battle